The Yauch-Ragar House is a historic house at 625 State Street in Pine Bluff, Arkansas.  It is a single-story brick structure, with a hip roof.  A gable projects from the front, with a large segmented-arch window at the center, and a smaller similar window in the gable.  To the projecting section's left, a porch is supported by Tuscan columns.  Built in 1907, the house is a rare example of brick construction from that period.  It was built by William Yauch, who with his brother owned a local brickworks.

The house was listed on the National Register of Historic Places in 1978.

See also

national Register of Historic Places listings in Jefferson County, Arkansas

References

Houses completed in 1907
Houses in Pine Bluff, Arkansas
Houses on the National Register of Historic Places in Arkansas
National Register of Historic Places in Pine Bluff, Arkansas